News 24 may refer to:
News 24 (Albania), a 24-hour news television channel in Albania
News24 (website), a South Africa-based news website
Rai News24, a 24-hour news television channel in Italy
BBC News 24, now known as BBC News, a UK 24-hour news television channel
TVNZ News 24, the working title of a New Zealand TV channel launched as TVNZ 7
News24 (Bangladesh), a national news channel of Bangladesh
News 24 (India), a national news channel of India
News 24 (Nepal), airs on the Nepal Broadcasting Channel (NBC)
News 24 (polska) news meteo channel polish

See also 

ABC News, an Australian 24-hour news channel operated by the Australian Broadcasting Corporation, formerly known as ABC News 24

BBC News, a British 24-hour news channel operated by the British Broadcasting Corporation, formerly known as BBC News 24

i24NEWS, an international news channel